Boonville Airport may refer to:

 Boonville Airport (California) in Boonville, California, United States (FAA: D83)
 Boonville Airport (Indiana) in Boonville, Indiana, United States (FAA: I91)

See also
Booneville Airport (disambiguation)